Rich Gunning (born June 15, 1966) is an American voice-over artist, radio commercial producer and former traffic reporter based in Philadelphia, Pennsylvania.

Early life and education
Gunning attended Council Rock High School in Newtown, Pennsylvania and the University of Maryland.

Career
He began his broadcasting career in the mid-1980s as a radio disc-jockey with former oldies station WBUX (Doylestown, Pennsylvania, USA). In 1986, he joined the United States Army and served two years at AFRTS in Germany. He was on active duty and the reserves until 1994. In addition to part-time on-air work at radio stations WDEL and WSTW (Wilmington, Delaware, USA), Gunning served as Production Manager and on-air personality with suburban Philadelphia news/talk radio station WNPV from 1994 to 2010.

Since 1998, Gunning has voiced hundreds of radio and television commercials. National voice-over clients have included Alarm.com, AOL, Burger King, Hawaii Tourism, Pontiac, Sears Auto Center, Triumph Motorcycles and Wyeth Labs.

From 2004 to 2018, he was employed by iHeart Media as a traffic reporter, heard primarily on KYW Newsradio in Philadelphia, as well as radio stations in Pittsburgh, New Jersey and Delaware.

In 2016, Gunning joined the staff at Philadelphia's Classical and Jazz station WRTI as an on-air personality.

References

External links
RichGunning.com - Official website
WRTI.org - WRTI-FM/Philadelphia

1966 births
Living people
American male voice actors
Radio personalities from Philadelphia
United States Army soldiers
United States Army reservists
University System of Maryland alumni